Priest, Politician, Collaborator: Jozef Tiso and the Making of Fascist Slovakia (2013) is a scholarly biography  Jozef Tiso, by the American historian James Mace Ward. The book received mostly positive reviews.

References

2013 non-fiction books
History books about the Holocaust
History books about Slovakia
Cornell University Press books